Godfrey Lias  was a British author, primarily of historical works, as well as a journalist, teacher and military man.

Career
During the first World War, Godfrey Lias was Captain and Adjutant, 11th Battalion Duke of Wellington's Regiment and Instructor at the Royal Military College, Sandhurst. At the outbreak of the Second World War, he joined the Foreign Office News Department. Later, he was British representative on the Inter-Allied Information Committee, the official publicity organ of the Ministries of Information of the Allied Governments in London. In 1944, he joined the Political Intelligence Department of the Foreign Office as Director of the Czechoslovak Region.

At one time, Godfrey Lias was an Assistant Master at Victoria College, Alexandria, Egypt, and then Head-master at the Muhammadan Anglo-Oriental College (now Aligarh Muslim University) in Aligarh, Uttar Pradesh, India.

He took the History Tripos at King's College, Cambridge, and in the period between WWI and WWII (i.e.: circa 1918–1939) was diplomatic correspondent of the Christian Science Monitor, for which time he was awarded an OBE for political and public services.

He was Correspondent of The Times, The Economist and Christian Science Monitor in Prague, from August 1945 until he was expelled by the communists in July 1949, then in Vienna until June 1953, when he returned to England.

Personal life

During Lias's time at the Foreign Office, his daughter Angela married archeologist Ronald F. Tylecote.

Published works
 Beneš of Czechoslovakia, G. Allen & Unwin, 1940
 I Survived, Evans Bros., 1954
 Glubb's Legion, Evans Bros., 1956
 Kazak Exodus, Evans Bros., 1956 (Translated into Turkish as: Büyük Kazak Göçü)
 Olaf, MacGibbon & Kee, 1958
 Doctor in revolt, by Dr. Geza as told to Godfrey Lias, London, F. Muller 1958
 Adventurer extraordinary; the Tiger Sarll story. With a foreword by Eamonn Andrews, London, Cassell, 1961
 With Garibaldi in Italy, F. Muller, 1963
 Kazak Exodus, Evans Bros., 1956.  Author information on jacket cover.

References

 National Library of Australia Catalog, search made 2010-06-12.

20th-century British writers
Officers of the Order of the British Empire
Duke of Wellington's Regiment officers
British Army personnel of World War I
British male journalists
The Times journalists
Year of birth missing
Year of death missing
20th-century British male writers